East Wheal Rose was a metalliferous mine around  south east of the village of St Newlyn East and is around  from Newquay on the north Cornwall coast, United Kingdom. The country rock at the mine was killas and its main produce was lead ore (galena), but as is usual when mining this mineral, commercial quantities of silver and zinc were also found and sold.

Lead was found in the area in 1812 and in 1834 the mine was established, by 1846 the mine employed over 1,200 men, women and children.

The two main lodes, called Middleton's Lode and East Lode, trended north-south. The ore they contained was in places very soft and loose and the killas was also not a particularly strong rock, necessitating extensive underground timbering, particularly in the shafts. Records show that the mine had more than twenty shafts on the two lodes, and the deepest workings were at 150 fathoms (900 ft).

Disaster in 1846
The mine was sited in the valley of a small stream at the point where it opens out into a natural bowl and is virtually surrounded by hills. The outlet from this bowl is through a narrow ravine through which the stream flows into the River Gannel. Just after noon on 9 July 1846 there was an unusually heavy thunderstorm which lasted an hour and a quarter. Captain Middleton, the mine manager, reported that within five minutes of it starting to rain, water was flowing down the hills in torrents. Despite efforts by the men on the surface to dam or divert the water from the shafts the mine was rapidly flooded up to the 50 fathom (300 ft) level, and of the estimated 200 miners who were underground at the time, 39 were drowned.

Later history
Despite the setback the mine soon reopened and continued producing ore until it closed in 1886. The engine was christened ″Inne's Engine″ by Lady Innes. Between 1845 and 1885 it produced 48,200 tons of 62% lead ore, 212,700 ounces of silver and 280 tons of zinc ore.

Today, apart from the preserved engine house and chimney stack (which stands at 120 ft high), there are few remains of the mine visible. The site is a tourist attraction with a boating lake, crazy golf etc. It is at one end of the Lappa Valley Steam Railway which follows part of the route of one of the Treffry Tramways that was opened in 1849 for hauling ore from the mine to Newquay.

References

Mines in Cornwall
Lead mines in England
Mining disasters in England
Disasters in Cornwall
1846 in England
1846 disasters in the United Kingdom
1846 mining disasters